OPEN Fest Sarajevo is the largest international libertarian festival in Europe. It is held annually in Sarajevo, Bosnia and Herzegovina. It is dedicated to the promotion of ideas of liberty and human rights. The Festival promotes economic and political freedoms, together with the fundamental rights of the individual. The festival was established by the Multi Group in cooperation with the Atlas Network, Students for Liberty and the Rising Tide Foundation. The first edition of the festival hosted over 10,000 guests, 50 NGO's and 40 international speakers.

Format
The festival is organized in January of each year and lasts for 5 days. It hosts a large conference and lecture program that focuses on the promotion of economic and political freedoms. Subjects that are treated include the free market, entrepreneurship, cryptocurrency, technology, legalisation of cannabis, Objectivism and others. The festival also hosts numerous art exhibitions, film screenings, workshops and a rich entertainment program that includes concerts and VIP parties. Guests and speakers have included FreedomWorks president and Tea Party leader Matt Kibbe, Bitnation founder Susanne Tarkowski Tempelhof, Iranian-Swedish author Nima Sanandaji, anarcho-capitalist economist and son of Milton Friedman, David D. Friedman, president of the University of the Philippines Alfredo Pascual, British journalist and research fellow at the Institute of Economic Affairs, Christopher Snowden and others.

References

External links
 Official website

Recurring events established in 2016
January events
Tourist attractions in Sarajevo
Annual events in Bosnia and Herzegovina
Festivals in Sarajevo
Free market
Libertarianism
2016 establishments in Bosnia and Herzegovina